Greece competed at the 2013 Mediterranean Games in Mersin, Turkey from 20 to  30 June 2013. The team ended up in the 6th place of the Games.

Athletics

Men

Women

Gymnastics

Handball

Men's tournament
A team of 16 athletes > 10th place
Preliminary round

Rowing

Sailing 

Men 

Women

Swimming 

Men 

Women

Taekwondo

Volleyball

Indoor

Women's tournament

Standings

Results

Water polo

Men's tournament

Team 

Alexandros Evgenios Gounas
Angelos Vlachopoulos
Christodoulos Kolomvos
Christos Afroudakis
Emmanouil Mylonakis
Evangelos Delakas
Ioannis Fountoulis
Konstantinos Galanidis
Konstantinos Genidounias
Konstantinos Gouvis
Konstantinos Mourikis
Konstantinos Tsalkanis
Kyriakos Pontikeas

Standings

Results

Semi Final

Third-fourth place final

Weightlifting

Wrestling

References

https://web.archive.org/web/20130703141013/http://www.pamesports.gr/248931/59-metallia-gia-thn-ellhnikh-apostolh-stoys-mesogeiakoys-agwnes
http://www.cijm.org.gr/index.php?lang=el
http://www.sentragoal.gr/article.asp?catid=16496&subid=2&pubid=129425446

Nations at the 2013 Mediterranean Games
2013
Mediterranean Games